Anthene indefinita is a butterfly in the family Lycaenidae. It is found in the Democratic Republic of the Congo (Uele and Shaba), Uganda, Ethiopia, central and western Kenya,  Tanzania and Burundi. The habitat consists of moist savanna and forests.

The larvae feed on Erythrococca rigidifolia.

References

Butterflies described in 1910
Anthene